Anett Vilipuu (born 25 September 1996) is an Estonian football player who plays for Levadia Tallinn, as a midfielder.

References

External links

1996 births
Living people
Place of birth missing (living people)
Estonian women's footballers
Women's association football defenders
Women's association football midfielders
Estonia women's international footballers
Estonian expatriates in England
Expatriate women's footballers in England
FC Levadia Tallinn (women) players